Miss Supranational 2022 was the 13th edition of the Miss Supranational pageant, held on 15 July 2022, at Strzelecki Park Amphitheater in Nowy Sącz, Poland. Chanique Rabe of Namibia crowned Lalela Mswane of South Africa at the end of the event. This edition marked the first back to back win for contestants from Africa, and the first Black woman who won Miss Supranational.

Background

Location and date 
On 26 April 2022, Gerhard Parzutka von Lipinski, the president of Miss and Mister Supranational, announced that 13th edition of the Miss Supranational competition would return to Nowy Sacz in the Małopolska region in June and July, and the final night would be held on 15 July 2022.

Presenters 
Anita Nneka Jones returned as host and joined by Martin Fitch, with backstage coverage by Ivan Podrez. 
Ivan Podrez, presenter of the Miss Supranational challenges
Nneka Jones, presenter for Sky News, BBC Radio London and Premier League
Martin Fitch, presenter and actor

Panel of experts 
The preliminary competition was broadcast live on the official Miss Supranational YouTube channel at 9pm CET on 12 July 2022. The preliminary interview judges and members of a panel of experts were announced.

Anntonia Porsild – Miss Supranational 2019 from Thailand
Chanique Rabe – Miss Supranational 2021 from Namibia
Gerhard Patzutka Von Lipinski – president of the Miss and Mister Supranational organisation
Valeria Vazquez Latorre – Miss Supranational 2018 from Puerto Rico and ambassador for Jubiler Schubert
Varo Vargas – Mister Supranational 2021 from Peru
Doda – Polish singer, winner of 130 music awards, activist and member of Mensa Poland (only as final telecast judge)
Marcelina Zawadzka – Television Host, model and Miss Polonia 2011 (only as final telecast judge)
Monika Lewczuk – Singer and Miss Supranational 2011 from Poland (only as final telecast judge)
Andre Sleigh – creative director of the Miss and Mister Supranational (only as preliminary judge)
Eoanna Constanza – Miss Supranational 2021 4th runner-up from Dominican Republic (only as preliminary judge)
Valentina Sánchez – Miss Supranational 2021 3rd Runner-up from Venezuela (only as preliminary judge)

New Supranational crown 
The new Miss Supranational crown was designed by Ricardo Patraca and was introduced during Miss Supranational 2022 preliminary competition.

Results

Placements 

Notes:

§ – placed into the Top 12 by fan-voting challenge

Δ – placed into the Top 24 by fast-track challenges

Continental Queens of Beauty 
It was awarded to delegates with the highest placement in the continent without being in the Top 5.

Special awards

Order of announcements

Top 24

Top 12

Top 5

Challenge events

Fast Track Events

Supra Fan-Vote
The winner of the Supra Fan Vote will automatically advance to the Top 12 finalists of Miss Supranational 2022.

Miss Supra Influencer
On 4 July 2022, Miss Supra Influencer Top 42 finalists were announced via the organization's official Facebook account. The Top 22 finalists were announced via Miss Supranational official instagram account on 6 July 2022.
The winner will be announced as a semi-finalist during the finals.

Supra Model of the Year
Supra Model of the Year was broadcast live via Miss Supranational official Facebook and YouTube on 3 July 2022.
 One of the five continental winners will be announced as the winner and be a semi-finalist in the finals.

Supra Chat

Round 1
Supra Chat 2022 Episode 1 premiered on Miss Supranational official YouTube channel on 9 June 2022.

Semi-finals

The 18 finalists were split into 2 semi-finals which were filmed in Poland. 5 winners from each semi-final will be chosen to advance to the finals.

Finals
The winner of each final will be announced as a semi-finalist during the finals.

Non-Fast Track Events

Miss Talent 
Talent competition were held on 3 July 2022, during the charity auction ‘Evening of Fashion and Culture for Ukraine’. The delayed broadcast of the competition were official premiered via Miss Supranational YouTube channel on 4 July 2022. Miss Malaysia, Melisha Lin was included in the line-up but were not chosen as a finalist.

Miss Elegance 
Miss Elegance competition were held on 8 July 2022. The delayed broadcast of the competition were official premiered via Miss Supranational YouTube channel on 9 July 2022. Miss Turkey, Şira Sahilli, was named as the winner at the end of the event.

Contestants
69 contestants competed for Miss Supranational 2022:

Notes

Debuts

Returns

Last competed in 2012:
 

Last competed in 2013:
 

Last competed in 2015:
 
 

Last competed in 2017:
 
 

Last competed in 2018:
 
 

Last competed in 2019:

Withdrawals
 
 
 
 
 
  - In light of the 2022 Russian invasion of Ukraine, the Miss Supranational organization barred Russia from competing.
  - Charlotte Umulisa pulled put of the competition after the Rwandan government suspended all pageants in the country.
 
 
 
 
  - Mathilde Honyiglo took part in Episode 3 of Supra Chat 2022 with no show in Poland and will instead compete in the following edition.

References

External links 
 

2022
2022 beauty pageants